Vítor Gabriel Lourenço Viana (born 28 July 1992) is a Portuguese footballer who plays for Associação Cultural e Desportiva da Correlhã , as a midfielder.

External links

1992 births
Living people
People from Viana do Castelo
Portuguese footballers
Association football midfielders
Liga Portugal 2 players
Segunda Divisão players
AD Oliveirense players
C.D. Trofense players
S.C. Espinho players
SC Vianense players
Sportspeople from Viana do Castelo District